Turbo marmoratus, known as the green turban, the marbled turban or great green turban, is a large species of marine gastropod with a thick calcareous operculum in the family Turbinidae, the turban snails.

The shells of these large sea snails have a very thick layer of nacre; this species has been commercially fished as a source of mother of pearl.

Distribution
These large snails live in tropical reefs in the Indian Ocean (off Tanzania, Madagascar, Aldabra and the Mascarene Basin) and tropical western Pacific oceans; also off Queensland, Australia. They are nocturnal and feed on algae.

Description
The distinctive shell grows to a length of 18 cm. The  large, imperforate, solid shell is ventricose, as broad as long. Its color pattern is green, marbled with white and rich brown. The 6-7 whorls are flattened or concave above, rounded and bearing two nodose keels below, and a stronger nodose carina above. It bears blunt tubercles, especially strong on the shoulders. Its large, circular aperture has a golden, pearly shine. The  base of the shell is produced. The columellar region is more or less excavated.

The subcircular operculum is somewhat concave within. Its outer surface is closely tuberculate and whitish.

Turbo marmoratus is the host of the ectoparasitic copepod Anthessius isamusi Uyeno & Nagasawa, 2012

The shell of marbled turbans is used as a source of nacre. The large opercula of Turbo marmoratus have been sold as paperweights or door stops.

References

 Oostingh, C.H., 1925. Report on a collection of recent shells from Obi and Halmahera, Molluccas. Mededeelingen van de Landbouwhoogeschool Wageningen, 29(1):1-362.
 Allan, J., 1950. Australian Shells: with related animals living in the sea, in freshwater and on the land. Georgian House, Melbourne. xix 470 pp..
 Drivas, J. & M. Jay (1988). Coquillages de La Réunion et de l'île Maurice
 Wilson, B., 1993. Australian Marine Shells. Prosobranch Gastropods. Odyssey Publishing, Kallaroo, WA
 Alf A. & Kreipl K. (2003). A Conchological Iconography: The Family Turbinidae, Subfamily Turbininae, Genus Turbo. Conchbooks, Hackenheim Germany.

External links 
 Coastal Fisheries Program info
 

marmoratus
Gastropods described in 1758
Taxa named by Carl Linnaeus
Marine gastropods